Falu FK is a Swedish football club located in Falun in Dalarna County.

Background
Falu FK was founded on 27 February 2006 following a joint initiative of the football sections of Falu BS, Slätta SK und Korsnäs IF FK clubs. The men's teams of the top two clubs merged in September of that year while Korsnäs IF FK retained its independence.  Falu BS and Slätta SK now only operate in football youth development. The newly formed club took the place of Falu BS in the third-tier Division 1 Norra.

Since their foundation Falu FK has participated in the middle divisions of the Swedish football league system.  The club currently plays in Division 2 Norra Svealand which is the fourth tier of Swedish football. They play their home matches at the Kopparvallen in Falun.

Falu FK are affiliated to Dalarnas Fotbollförbund.

Current squad

Staff
 Head coach:  Tomas Johansson
 Assistant coach:  Peter Lundin
 Team-Manager:  Patrik Andersson
 Fitness coach:  Henrik Adolfsson

References

External links
   Official site

Association football clubs established in 2006
Sport in Falun
Football clubs in Dalarna County
2006 establishments in Sweden